Baeckea grandiflora, commonly known as the large-flowered baeckea, is a common heathland shrub found in coastal central Western Australia. It has white or pink flowers from August to December.

Description
Baeckea grandiflora is an upright, open shrub, with narrow, upward to spreading stems, up to a height . The sepals  are shorter than the petals.

Taxonomy and naming
Baeckea grandiflora was first formally described by the botanist George Bentham in 1867 and the description was published in Compositae Flora Australiensis The specific epithet (grandiflora) means "large" in reference to the large size of the flowers.

Distribution and habitat
Large-flowered baeckea is often found on plains, undulating hills and breakaways in the Swan Coastal Plain IBRA region around the Shire of Gingin where it grows on gravelly loamy and sandy soils over laterite.

See also
List of Baeckea species

References

Flora of Western Australia
grandiflora
Plants described in 1867